The 2016 West Indies Tri-Series was a One Day International (ODI) cricket tournament held in the West Indies in June 2016. It was a tri-nation series between the national representative cricket teams of the West Indies, Australia and South Africa. All the matches were played under lights and it was the first time a series in the Caribbean had all the matches played as day-night games. Australia won the tournament by defeating the West Indies by 58 runs in the final.

Squads

John Hastings was ruled out of the tournament with an ankle injury and was replaced with Scott Boland. Rilee Rossouw injured his shoulder during the third ODI match. He was replaced by Dean Elgar. David Warner broke his index finger whilst fielding during the fourth ODI match and was ruled out the rest of the series.

Points table
 Qualified for the Final

Matches

1st ODI

2nd ODI

3rd ODI

4th ODI

5th ODI

6th ODI

7th ODI

8th ODI

9th ODI

Final

References

External links
 Series home at ESPN Cricinfo

2016 in Australian cricket
2016 in South African cricket
2016 in West Indian cricket
International cricket competitions in 2016
Australian cricket tours of the West Indies
South African cricket tours of the West Indies